Vegard is a Norwegian given name. It may refer to:

Given name
Vegard Aanestad (born 1987), Norwegian footballer
Vegard Arnhoff (born 1977), Norwegian sailor
Vegard Bergan (born 1995), Norwegian footballer
Vegard Braaten (born 1987), Norwegian footballer
Vegard Breen (born 1990), Norwegian cyclist
Vegard Robinson Bugge (born 1989), Norwegian cyclist
Vegard Bye (born 1951), Norwegian political scientist, writer, consultant and ex-politician
Vegard Ellefsen (born 1950), Norwegian diplomat
Vegard Erlien (born 1998), Norwegian footballer
Vegard Forren (born 1988), Norwegian footballer 
Vegard Hansen (born 1969), Norwegian football coach
Vegard Heggem (born 1975), Norwegian footballer
Vegard Høidalen (born 1971), Norwegian beach volleyball player
Vegard Berg Johansen (born 1973), Norwegian footballer 
Vegard Lysvoll (born 1989), Norwegian footballer
Vegard Leikvoll Moberg (born 1991), Norwegian footballer
Vegard Bjerkreim Nilsen (born 1993), Norwegian cross-country skier
Vegard Opaas (born 1962), Norwegian ski jumper
Vegard Røed (born 1975), Norwegian footballer
Vegard Samdahl (born 1978), Norwegian handballer
Vegard Sannes (born 1976), Norwegian footballer
Vegard Skirbekk (born 1975), Norwegian economist and social scientist
Vegard Skjerve (born 1988), Norwegian footballer
Vegard Haukø Sklett (born 1986), Norwegian former ski jumper
Vegard Skogheim (born 1966), Norwegian footballer and football coach
Vegard Sletten (1907–1984), Norwegian journalist and newspaper editor
Vegard Thune (born 1951), Norwegian politician
Vegard Tveitan (born 1975), Norwegian composer, multi-instrumentalist, and vocalist known as Ihsahn
Vegard Ulvang (born 1963), Norwegian cross-country skier 
Vegard Wennesland (born 1983), Norwegian politician
Vegard Ylvisåker, part of the Norwegian comedy duo Ylvis

Middle name
Finn Vegard Nordhagen, Norwegian racing cyclist

Surname
Jon Grunde Vegard (born 1957), Norwegian diver
Lars Vegard (1880–1963), Norwegian physicist, known for Vegard's law

See also
Vegar